The 2022 Big 12 men's basketball tournament was a postseason men's basketball tournament for teams of the Big 12 Conference. It was played March 9–12, 2022, in Kansas City, Missouri, at the T-Mobile Center. Kansas won the tournament, their 12th Big 12 Tournament championship, to earn the conference's automatic berth in the 2022 NCAA tournament. The tournament was sponsored by Phillips 66.

Seeds
For the second time in conference history and the first time since the conference became a 10-team conference, the entire conference did not participate in the tournament. Oklahoma State did not participate due to its postseason ban. The only other time this happened was in 2004, when Baylor missed the tournament. 

The top seven teams earned a first-round bye. Teams were seeded by record within the conference, with a tiebreaker system to seed teams with identical conference records. The first tiebreaker, as is standard in most sports, is head-to-head results between the tied teams. The second tiebreaker is taking the head-to-head results against each team in the conference beginning with the first-place team and working down until there is no longer a tie.

Schedule

Bracket

References

Tournament
Big 12 men's basketball tournament
Big 12 men's basketball tournament
Big 12 men's basketball tournament
College sports tournaments in Missouri